The 4th Cavalry Division (4. Kavallerie-Division) was a unit of the German Army in World War I. The division was formed on the mobilization of the German Army in August 1914. The division was disbanded in 1919 during the demobilization of the German Army after World War I.

Combat chronicle 
It was initially assigned to II Cavalry Corps, which preceded the 1st and 2nd Armies on the Western Front. In November 1914, it was transferred to Russia. In March 1918, it returned to the Western Front, where it served in Alsace until the end of the war. It was dismounted in October 1916 and restructured to form the 4th Cavalry Schützen Division. By the end of the war, it was serving under 64th Corps (z.b.V.), Armee-Abteilung B, Heeresgruppe Herzog Albrecht von Württemberg on the Western Front.

A more detailed combat chronicle can be found at the German-language version of this article.

Order of Battle on mobilisation 
On formation, in August 1914, the component units of the division were:

3rd Cavalry Brigade (from II Army Corps District)
2nd (Pomeranian) Cuirassiers “Queen”
9th (2nd Pomeranian) Uhlans
17th Cavalry Brigade (from IX Corps District)
17th (1st Grand Ducal Mecklenburgian) Dragoons
18th (2nd Grand Ducal Mecklenburgian) Dragoons
18th Cavalry Brigade (from IX Army Corps District)
15th (Hannover) Hussars "Queen Wilhelmina of the Netherlands"
16th (Schleswig-Holstein) Hussars "Emperor Francis Joseph of Austria, King of Hungary"
Horse Artillery Abteilung of the 3rd (1st Brandenburg) Field Artillery "General-Feldzeugmeister" Regiment
2nd Guards Machine Gun Detachment
Pioneer Detachment
Signals Detachment
Heavy Wireless Station 18
Heavy Wireless Station 19
Light Wireless Station 10
Light Wireless Station 12
Cavalry Motorised Vehicle Column 4

See: Table of Organisation and Equipment

4th Cavalry Schützen Division 

The 4th Cavalry Division was extensively reorganised in the course of the war, culminating in its conversion to a Cavalry Schützen Division, that is to say, dismounted cavalry. Here, the cavalry brigades were renamed Cavalry Schützen Commands and performed a similar role to that of an infantry regiment command. Likewise, the cavalry regiments became Cavalry Schützen Regiments and allocated the role of an infantry battalion (and their squadrons acted as infantry companies). However, these units were much weaker than normal infantry formations (for example, a Schützen squadron had a strength of just 4 officers and 109 NCOs and other ranks, considerably less than that of an infantry company).

3rd Cavalry Brigade became independent on 30 November 1914
17th Cavalry Brigade became independent on 1 February 1917
18th Cavalry Brigade transferred to 1st Cavalry Division on 12 December 1916
28th Cavalry Brigade joined from 6th Cavalry Division on 1 February 1917. Transferred to 7th Cavalry Division on 17 May 1918
39th Cavalry Brigade reconstituted on 28 September 1914 (original brigade had been broken up on mobilisation). Transferred to 8th Cavalry Division on 1 February 1917. Rejoined from 8th Cavalry Division on 6 April 1918
45th Cavalry Brigade (previously independent) joined on 1 February 1917. Transferred to 6th Cavalry Division on 1 May 1918

Late World War I organization 
Allied Intelligence rated this division as 4th Class (of 4 classes). It's late war organisation made it more akin to a Landwehr Division and was:

39th Cavalry Brigade
Saxon Reserve Uhlans (Schützen)
9th Reserve Uhlans (Schützen)
87th Cavalry (Schützen)
38th Landwehr Infantry Regiment
40th Landwehr Infantry Regiment
2nd Guards Machine Gun Detachment
6th Machine Gun Detachment
Artillery Command
Horse Artillery Abteilung of the 8th (von Holtzendorff) (1st Rhenish) Field Artillery Regiment
Horse Artillery Abteilung of the 10th (von Scharnhorst) (1st Hannover) Field Artillery Regiment
1400th Light Ammunition Column
1405th Light Ammunition Column
Pioneer Battalion
4th Cavalry Pioneer Detachment
145th Light Searchlight Section
Signal Command
934th Telephone Detachment
Medical and Veterinary
21st? Ambulance Company
573rd Ambulance Company
191st Field Hospital
Vet. Hospital
Attached
Landsturm Infantry Battalion 1 Torgau (IV/15)

See also 

German Army (German Empire)
German cavalry in World War I
German Army order of battle (1914)

References

Bibliography 
 
 
 
 

Cavalry divisions of Germany in World War I
Military units and formations established in 1914
Military units and formations disestablished in 1919